Obeida Abu Rabiya (born 10 February 1990) is an Israeli footballer who currently plays for Maccabi Ahi Nazareth.

Notes

External links
 

1990 births
Living people
Israeli footballers
Arab-Israeli footballers
Maccabi Ahi Nazareth F.C. players
Hapoel Ironi Baqa al-Gharbiyye F.C. players
Maccabi Ironi Tamra F.C. players
Liga Leumit players
Israeli Premier League players
Footballers from Nazareth
Association football wingers
Israeli people of Saudi Arabian descent